Saulsberry is a surname. Notable people with the surname include:

 Christian Saulsberry (1997–2022), American football player
 Quentin Saulsberry (born 1988), American football player
 Rodney Saulsberry (born 1956), American voice actor

See also
 Salisbury